In Greek mythology, the name Thersander or Thersandros (/θɜːrˈsændər, -ˈsɑːn-/; Ancient Greek:  means 'bold man' derived from   'boldness, braveness' and   'of a man') was one of the Epigoni, who attacked the city of Thebes. This is in retaliation for the deaths of their fathers, the war of the Seven against Thebes, who had attempted the same thing.

Family 
Thersander was the son of Polynices and Argia. He was succeeded by his son Tisamenus, whose mother was Demonassa.

Mythology 
Thersander may have bribed Eriphyle with the robe of Harmonia so that she sent her son, Alcmaeon, to fight with him.  His father did the same with the necklace of Harmonia, to convince her to send her husband with the original attackers.  The attack of the Epigoni was successful, and Thersander became the king of Thebes. Thersander intended to fight for the Greeks during the Trojan War, but was killed by Telephus before the war began, while the Greeks had mistakenly stopped in Mysia. Pindar refers to Thersander as gaining honor after Polynices' death and preserving the house of Adrastus for later generations.

Notes

References 

 Pausanias, Description of Greece with an English Translation by W.H.S. Jones, Litt.D., and H.A. Ormerod, M.A., in 4 Volumes. Cambridge, MA, Harvard University Press; London, William Heinemann Ltd. 1918. . Online version at the Perseus Digital Library
Pausanias, Graeciae Descriptio. 3 vols. Leipzig, Teubner. 1903.  Greek text available at the Perseus Digital Library.
 Pindar, Odes translated by Diane Arnson Svarlien. 1990. Online version at the Perseus Digital Library.
 Pindar, The Odes of Pindar including the Principal Fragments with an Introduction and an English Translation by Sir John Sandys, Litt.D., FBA. Cambridge, MA., Harvard University Press; London, William Heinemann Ltd. 1937. Greek text available at the Perseus Digital Library.
 Pseudo-Apollodorus, The Library with an English Translation by Sir James George Frazer, F.B.A., F.R.S. in 2 Volumes, Cambridge, MA, Harvard University Press; London, William Heinemann Ltd. 1921. Online version at the Perseus Digital Library. Greek text available from the same website.

Achaean Leaders
Characters in Greek mythology